The 2011–12 1. FC Nürnberg season is the 112nd season in the club's football history.

Match results

Legend

Bundesliga

DFB-Pokal

Player information

Roster and statistics

Transfers

In

Out

Kits

Sources

Match Reports

Other sources

1. FC Nürnberg seasons
Nuremberg